Ryan Steele may refer to:
Ryan Steele (comedian), one-half of the duo The Ryan and Amy Show
Ryan Steele (actor),  American dancer and actor
Ryan Steele, a VR Troopers character